The Next Generation of Genealogy Sitebuilding or TNG is a genealogy software installed in a web server developed by Darrin Lythgoe. It was mentioned in several press reviews used for genealogy site building. The data is stored in MySQL database tables and displayed in PHP scripting language which can be a module in different content management system platforms.

Languages 
The public and administrative display messages can be translated into Afrikaans, Croatian, Czech, Danish, Dutch, Finnish, French, German, Greek, Italian, Norwegian, Polish, Brazilian Portuguese, Romanian, Spanish and Swedish, and  public messages can be translated into Icelandic and Serbian while help files and installation instructions can also be translated into French and Dutch.

Features 
 User account registration
 Pedigree, relationship, descendancy, register charts
 What's New and Most Wanted pages
 RSS
 CMS Integrations such as WordPress and Joomla

Notes

Further reading

External links 
 
 TNG community forum

Genealogy software